Area 51 is a 2015 American found footage science fiction horror film directed and shot by Oren Peli and co-written by Peli and Christopher Denham. The film stars Reid Warner, Darrin Bragg, Ben Rovner, and Jelena Nik. The film was produced by Jason Blum under his Blumhouse Productions banner, and was released in a limited release and through video on demand on May 15, 2015, by Paramount Insurge.

Plot
Three close friends, Reid, Darrin, and Ben, attend a party together, during which Reid vanishes. Unable to locate him, Ben and Darrin leave. Driving home on a dark, secluded road, the two nearly run over their friend Reid, who is inexplicably standing in the roadway in a daze.

After the incident, Reid becomes fascinated with aliens and, in particular, Area 51. Reid spends months planning to infiltrate Area 51 to uncover the base's secrets. However, Reid's obsessive extraterrestrial research leaves him detached from his family and he loses his job. Reid recruits his friends Darrin and Ben. Together with Jelena, another conspiracy theorist whose father worked at Area 51, they contrive to sneak onto the military base using signal jammers, night vision goggles, Freon-laced jumpsuits, and pills to mask their ammonia levels. Jelena's father advises the group to investigate a man who works at Area 51 in a key position. Reid and Darrin sneak into the man's house and steal his security badge. Ben drops his three friends off in the desert outside the base and waits for their return. Reid, Darrin and Jelena bypass the base's perimeter defenses. They use the stolen security badge to enter the complex. Exploring the base, the trio discover a lab containing anti-gravity material and a lifelike liquid substance. They also find an alien spacecraft in a hangar, which only Reid can enter or interact with. The three reach the 'S4'-level of Area 51, which stores the complex's most secret information and experiments. They trigger an alarm and are swarmed by guards. Darrin gets separated from his friends. Eluding the guards, Darrin narrowly escapes a predatory alien and retreats to the base's higher levels.

Reid and Jelena venture deeper into the complex to discover a cavern-like structure beneath Area 51. There they find articles of clothing, toys, and later, pods containing human blood and organs. The two stumble on a colony of sleeping aliens. An alien awakens and chases them out of the cave into a different section of the complex where they find themselves in a white chamber. As Reid examines a series of alien symbols, Jelena is suddenly dragged away by an unseen force. Reid locates her, but she is unresponsive and in a trance. The chamber suddenly loses gravity, revealing them on board a silver alien spacecraft, from which Reid's camera falls and plummets to the ground.

Darrin successfully escapes the complex to learn that all base personnel are evacuating Area 51. He exits back into the desert, where he finds Ben waiting for the trio to return. Darrin explains their group was separated. He frantically urges Ben to drive away; however, the car's engine dies. The camcorder captures the pair's abduction from the car.

In a post-credits scene, an old man the group previously interviewed finds Reid's camcorder, which is still-recording.

Cast
 Reid Warner as Reid 
 Darrin Bragg as Darrin
 Jelena Nik as Jelena
 Ben Rovner as Ben
 Sandra Staggs as Mother
 Roy Abramsohn as Father
 Frank Novak as himself
 David Saucedo as Town Local
 Glenn Campbell as himself
 Jamel King as Jamel Bragg
 Nikka Far as Nikki
 Norio Hayakawa as himself

Production
Production for the film began in the fall of 2009. In April 2011, CBS Films hired director and actor Christopher Denham to do some rewrites on Area 51. Peli filmed re-shoots in 2013. In August 2013, Jason Blum stated that the film had finished production and that Peli was "tinkering" with the film in post production. On March 14, 2015, Blum confirmed that the film was officially done and would perhaps be released on VOD. On April 23, 2015 it was announced the film would open exclusively in Alamo Drafthouse theaters and through video on demand platforms on May 15, 2015.

Release

Box office and sales
The film was released in Alamo Drafthouse theaters exclusively for a weekend-long-run, and on video on demand  platforms beginning on May 15, 2015, courtesy of Paramount Insurge and Blumhouse Tilt. The film made a total of $7,556 for its weekend long-run.

Reception
Area 51 received generally negative reviews from critics. On Rotten Tomatoes it has an approval rating of 13% based on reviews from 8 critics.

Brian Tallerico writing for RogerEbert.com gave the film one and half stars and mainly criticized the film's generic plot and pacing. A. A. Dowd from The A.V. Club gave Area 51 a 'C'-rating and criticized the film's originality when compared to Oren Peli's previous film, Paranormal Activity.

The film has found an avid audience on the Paramount+ streaming service.

References

External links
 

2015 films
2015 horror films
2010s science fiction horror films
2015 independent films
American science fiction horror films
American independent films
Paramount Pictures films
Found footage films
Blumhouse Productions films
IM Global films
Films produced by Jason Blum
Films set in 2009
Films set in Nevada
2010s English-language films
2010s American films